The 2018–19 season was Real Sporting's 113th season in existence and the club's 47th season in the second flight of Spanish football, the second one since its last relegation. It covers a period from 1 July 2018 to 30 June 2019.

Season overview

Pre-season
On 12 June 2018, Alberto Lora announced he would leave Real Sporting after spending 12 seasons in the club. The board of directors, players and supporters went to his farewell.

Two days later, Miguel Torrecilla, director of football, announced that after the great success of the reserve team in the previous season, six players would promote to the first team: Nacho Méndez, Juan Rodríguez, Dani Martín, Isma Cerro, Cristian Salvador and Álvaro Traver.

On 4 July 2018, Portuguese midfielder André Sousa became the first new player of the season. He came loaned from Belenenses, with a buy-option for Real Sporting. Five days later, Isma López rescinded with the club for signing with Cypriot AC Omonia. The Navarrese player left the team after five seasons with 130 league games played and eight goals scored.

Also in that week, Carlos Castro was transferred to Mallorca for an undisclosed fee.

On 11 July, right back Francisco Molinero arrived to Gijón from Getafe for signing with the club the next day. Only one day later, another new right back arrived to Mareo: Portuguese André Geraldes came loaned from Sporting CP after spending the last season with André Sousa at Belenenses.

On 18 July, Real Sporting played their first match of the preseason at Villaviciosa. Despite receiving a first goal, they beat homers Lealtad by 2–1. Gorka Santamaría, signed for the reserves, and Pablo Fernández scored the two goals.

On 23 July, the club signed Finnish international winger Robin Lod for two seasons. Two days later, after requesting to leave the club for playing in La Liga, Sergio Álvarez was transferred to Eibar. The Asturian midfielder spent 13 seasons in the club.

Before these two transfers, Diego Mariño received the Molinón de Plata award for the best player of the previous season.

On 27 July, Real Sporting beat Langreo by 2–0 in a match where striker Neftali Manzambi, that is in the club as a test player, made a notable performance.

On 2 August, the day after a win against Cultural Leonesa, Real Sporting announced French defender Mathieu Peybernes, who came on loan from Lorient. Five days later, Manzambi agreed to remain in the B-side with a one-year loan from Basel and on the next day, Ghanain Isaac Cofie signed a two-year contract with the club.

On 14 August, Federico Barba left Real Sporting for coming back to Italy after Chievo Verona paid the termination clause of the player. One day later, English striker Nick Blackman joined the club on a season-long loan from Derby County.

August
On 18 August, as in the previous season, Real Sporting started the season with a draw at Alcorcón. This time, Real Sporting rescued one point thanks to a great shot of André Sousa in the 93rd minute. 17-year-old player Pelayo Morilla made his debut with the first side.

After this match, left back Javi Noblejas signed for the club, as Serbian striker Uroš Đurđević, who, for a fee of about €2 million became the most expensive transfer in the club's history, and winger Álvaro, loaned from Getafe after he could not sign with Málaga, that had problems their salary cap.

The second match of the season was played on 26 August, and Real Sporting defeated Gimnàstic by 2–0 with goals of Hernán Santana and Robin Lod, both players scoring for the first time with the Asturian team.

September
Real Sporting continued unbeaten after the third round, by beating debutants Extremadura 2–0. This win allowed the team to reach the direct promotion positions for the first time in the season.

The first loss arrived on 9 September, at Riazor, with a goal of Pablo Marí for Deportivo La Coruña in the 94th minute, in a very criticized match by the local media due to not shooting on target in the whole game. Robin Lod, called up for playing the UEFA Nations League with Finland, missed the game. Rubén Baraja and the rest of the technical staff were worried about his presence with the national team as he was recently recovered from an injury.

After the disappointment at Coruña, Real Sporting faced the Copa del Rey and beat Numancia by 1–2. Pelayo Morilla, with only 17 years old, netted the second goal for the team. However, in the league match played four days later at El Molinón, the rojiblancos only could earn one point after a 1–1 due to a controversial goal for Numancia, where an offside was claimed.

On 22 September, Sporting extended their streak without wins with a 1–0 loss at El Sadar against Osasuna. The performance was again heavily criticized, as after the match at Riazor, due to not shooting again on target during the 90 minutes.

The month of September ended with a 1–0 win against Las Palmas, and showed the differences of the team depending on playing at home and away.

October
October was not a good month for Real Sporting. They started it with a loss at Wanda Metropolitano against Rayo Majadahonda in a match where the first shouts of "Baraja out" were heard. The bad streak continued at home, where the team only earned one point against Reus Deportiu thanks to a penalty kick scored by Carlos Carmona in the 93rd minute (previously, Uroš Đurđević missed another one) and the shouts against Rubén Baraja continued.

In a decisive week for the coach, Real Sporting won in the third round of the 2018–19 Copa del Rey after a penalty shootout against Rayo Majadahonda. Ten players that previously played for the B-side participated in the match. The bad streak continued at home with a goalless draw against Córdoba. Again, people protested against the board of directors and the manager.

November
The streak without winning continued at Estadio Mediterráneo, where Real Sporting lost 1–2 to Almería in a match with a controversial penalty kick for the homers to tie the game and a not allowed legal goal of Cristian Salvador with 1–1 in the scoreboard, and just before the second goal for Almería.

Before the Asturian derby, Real Sporting saved one point in the 94th minute in their home match against Málaga, that ended with a 2–2 draw. Again, the crowd shouted against Baraja and shouted the name of José Alberto, manager of the B-side. Finally, Baraja was sacked after losing the derby against Oviedo and José Alberto took the helm of the team. In that match, Isma Cerro suffered an injury that forced him to miss the rest of the season.

In his first match, José Alberto managed the team to the club's first win ever at Granada, beating the homers by 2–1 with a free kick shot of Álvaro Traver in the 92nd minute.

December
The month started with a 2–1 win at El Molinón against Tenerife, in the debut of José Alberto at home. Finally and after 14 league matches, Uroš Đurđević scored his first league goal with the club.

Five days later, Real Sporting qualified for the first time in ten years to the Copa del Rey's round of 16 after eliminating Eibar thanks to the 2–2 draw at Ipurua. The rojiblancos were the only non-first-tier team to qualify to this round.

José Alberto ended the year unbeaten after achieving one more win against Mallorca and a goalless draw at Lugo.

January
On 6 January, Real Sporting lost its first match at home, after the come back of Zaragoza at El Molinón. Three days later, the team would achieve another win at the Copa del Rey, by defeating top-tier Valencia by 2–1. Javi Noblejas scored his first goal with Real Sporting and Nick Blackman made a header-goal for the win. However, the team would be eliminated after being defeated 0–3 at Mestalla.

The month of January ended with three new signs and one player leaving the club on loan made during the winter transfer window. Ivi, Álex Alegría and Aitor García signed for the club while Neftali Manzambi was loaned to Córdoba after transferring the player from Basel.

February
With the three new signs making their debut with Real Sporting, the team started the month by widely beating Extremadura at Almendralejo, with Đurđević scoring a brace. However, despite this good match, the month would be disastrous after losing the next three matches with Osasuna, Las Palmas, Rayo Majadahonda, being the team, specially the defense, strongly criticized.

March
March would see the club's reaction to the bad streak starting with an away win against Numancia, followed by three more, specially important the one against Oviedo at the Asturian derby thanks to an own goal of Christian Fernández. Sporting would progress slowly positions in the table as they only earn one point in their visit to Málaga.

April
Real Sporting recovered the winning streak in the next week at Tenerife and at home against Granada with two goals of Uroš Đurđević. In the match against Granada, the Serbian striker would score the fastest goal in the club's history after earning the only goal of the match with only ten seconds played.

These would be the end of the winning streak for starting a last outrageous break, with two draws against last qualified Gimnàstic and Elche, despite a starting goal of Jean-Sylvain Babin.

May and June
A loss in the last play of the match against Mallorca, where Diego Mariño got injured for the rest of the season, would practically mean the end of the possibilities of Real Sporting to qualify for the playoffs, and these would definitively disappear with a goalless home draw against Lugo and two consecutive losses at Zaragoza and against Albacete.

The season finished with a 1–0 win against Cádiz, with a goal of Nacho Méndez. This was the last match of captain Roberto Canella, who would leave Real Sporting after spending twelve seasons in the club. Just after the match, Jean-Sylvain Babin announced he would extend his contract for three more years, being this confirmed by the club the next day.

Players

Current squad

From the reserve team

In

Out

Technical staff

Managerial changes

Pre-season and friendlies

Competitions

Segunda División

League table

Results summary

Positions by round

Matches

Copa del Rey

Matches

Statistics

Appearances and goals

|-
|colspan="12"|Players who have left the club after the start of the season:

Disciplinary record

|-
|colspan=17 align=left|Players who have left the club after the start of the season:

References

External links

Sporting de Gijón seasons
Sporting de Gijon
Sporting de Gijon